Shehri may refer to:

 Shehri language, a Modern South Arabian language of Oman
 Al-Shehri, an Arabic-language surname (including a list of persons with the name)

See also 
 Shahri (disambiguation)